Iss Pyaar Ko Kya Naam Doon? 3 is an Indian drama television series that aired on Star Plus from 3 July 2017 to 6 October 2017. Produced by Gul Khan under 4 Lions Films, it starred Barun Sobti and Shivani Tomar. The story is set in Allahabad and Mumbai. It is the third installment of the Iss Pyaar Ko Kya Naam Doon? series.

Plot 
Dev and Chandni are childhood friends, hailing from Allahabad. Dev's father is the Mahant (chief priest) of a temple known for its hidden treasure. Dev's father is arrested for stealing the idol's jewellery and his wife is accused of being a witch. They are killed by a mysterious person after which Chandni's father Yash Narayana Vashisht becomes the Mahant. Dev escapes with his younger brother Meeku, and while travelling by train, he is forced to throw his brother out to save him from a mob.

16 years later 
Dev has returned to Allahabad disguised as Advay Singh Raizada. Holding Chandni and her family responsible for what his family had to go through and his separation from his brother, he plans to take revenge. He buys the house the Vashishts are living in but lets them stay there. Meanwhile, Chandni's wedding is fixed to PP, a sleazy man whose family is going to pay off her stepmother's debt. Advay rescues her from her fiance's behaviour on several occasions but not without insulting her each time. Chandni is confused about why he hates her so much. He further disrupts her wedding and forcibly marries her by blackmailing her that he will reveal the truth of her illegitimate child who currently stays in an orphanage. Chandni agrees to save the respect of her family but doesn't tell Advay that the child is actually her sister's.

Advay exposes this anyway at their reception party in order to spoil the Vashisht family's reputation. He throws them out of the house but his grandmother shelters Chandni. She believes in Chandni's innocence and asks her never to leave Advay no matter what happens even though Advay has been emotionally abusive and misogynistic. Eventually, the truth finally comes out before Chandni and Advay. Chandni realises Advay is her long lost childhood friend Dev and Advay discovers that Chandni has been innocent all along. Chandni has her stepmother, the real culprit, arrested and seeks out Miku, reuniting him with Advay. Miku falls in love with Chandni's sister Shikha and the family plans to get them married.

Cast

Main
 Barun Sobti as Advay Singh Raizada / Dev Kashyap
Shivani Tomar as Chandni Narayan Vashishth, Dev's childhood friend
Ritu Shivpuri as Indrani Narayan Vashishth, main antagonist

Recurring
Tarun Anand as Yash Narayan Vashishth, Indrani's husband, the deputy Mahant
Ketki Kadam as Shikha Narayan Vashishth, Indrani's younger daughter
Shagun Sharma as Meghna Narayan Vashishth, Indrani's younger elder daughter
Sameer Dharmadhikari as Mahant, Advay & Meeku's father, chief priest of a fictitious Shiv temple in Allahabad
Mitali Nag as Advay's mother
 Randeep Malik as Rajveer Singh Raizada / Meeku, Advay's younger brother
Seema Azmi as Kajal, Indrani's sister
Jaswant Menaria as Rajit, Kajal's husband
Salina Prakash as Shakun, Indrani's sister
 Juhi Aslam as Shilpa, Advay's assistant and spy, servant of Raizada house
Sanjay Choudhary as Murli, Advay's assistant and spy, servant of Raizada house
Rishika Mihani as Pooja Raizada, Advay's cousin sister
 Ritu Chaudhary as Leela Raizada, Pooja's mother
Kabir Altaf Shah as Aditya, Pooja's son
Smriti Khanna as Sasha, Advay's girlfriend
Pearl V Puri as Sushant, Advay's friend

Guest stars 
Nakuul Mehta as Shivaay Singh Oberoi from Ishqbaaz, Advay's close friend
Reyhna Malhotra as Svetlana Kapoor from Ishqbaaz, Sasha's friend
Badshah as himself, a special appearance for Advay and Chandini's wedding ceremony
Mika Singh as himself

Production

Cancellation
The series did not reach adequate ratings and StarPlus ended the show after completing 70 episodes.

References

External links
 Iss Pyaar Ko Kya Naam Doon 3 on Hotstar
 

StarPlus original programming
2017 Indian television series debuts
Hindi-language television shows
Indian drama television series
Indian romance television series
Indian mystery television series
Television shows set in Uttar Pradesh
2017 Indian television series endings
Television series by 4 Lions Films